Joual is an accepted name for the linguistic features of Quebec French that are associated with the French-speaking working class in Montreal which has become a symbol of national identity for some.  Joual has historically been stigmatized by some, and celebrated by others. While Joual is often considered a sociolect of the Québécois working class, many feel that perception is outdated, with Joual becoming increasingly present in the arts.

Speakers of Quebec French from outside Montreal usually have other names to identify their speech, such as Magoua in Trois-Rivières, and Chaouin south of Trois-Rivières. Linguists tend to eschew this term, but historically some have reserved the term Joual for the variant of Quebec French spoken in Montreal.

Both the upward socio-economic mobility among the Québécois, and a cultural renaissance around Joual connected to the Quiet Revolution in the Montreal East-End have resulted in Joual being spoken by people across the educational and economic spectrum.  Today, many Québécois who were raised in Quebec during the 20th century (command of English notwithstanding) can understand and speak at least some Joual.

History 

The creation of Joual can be traced back to the "era of silence", the period from the 1840s to the 1960s and the start of the Quiet Revolution. The "era of silence" was marked with stark stigmatization of the common working man. Written documents were not shared with the typical working class man, and the very strict form of French that was used by elites excluded a majority of the population. The Quiet Revolution during the 1960s was a time of awakening, in which the Quebec working class demanded more respect in society, including wider use of Québécois in literature and the performing arts. Michel Tremblay is an example of a writer who deliberately used Joual and Québécois to represent the working class populations of Quebec. Joual, a language of the working class, quickly became associated with slang and vulgar language. Despite its continued use in Canada, there are still ideologies present which place a negative connotation on the use of Joual.

Origin of the name Joual 
Although coinage of the name joual is often attributed to French-Canadian journalist André Laurendeau, who in October 1959 wrote an article in Le Devoir criticizing the quality of the French language spoken by French Canadian students, the usage of this term throughout French-speaking Canada likely predates this text.

The actual word Joual is the representation of how the word cheval (Standard French: , horse) is pronounced by those who speak Joual. ("Horse" is used in a variation of the phrase parler français comme une vache [to speak French like a cow], i.e. to speak French terribly; hence, a put-down of the Québécois dialect.) The weak schwa vowel  disappeared. The end result is the word  transcribed as Joual.

Most notable or stereotypical linguistic features
Diphthongs are normally present where long vowels would be present in standard French. There is also the usage of sontaient, sonté (ils étaient, ils ont été).

Although moé and toé  are today considered substandard slang pronunciations of moi and toi, these were the original pronunciations of ancien régime French used in all provinces of Northern France, by the royalty, aristocracy, and common people.  After the 1789 French Revolution, the standard pronunciation in France changed to that of a previously-stigmatized form in the speech of Paris, but Quebec French continued to evolve from the historically older dialects, having become isolated from France following the 1760 British conquest of New France.

Joual shares many features with modern Oïl languages, such as Norman, Gallo, Picard, Poitevin and Saintongeais though its affinities are greatest with the 17th century koiné of Paris. Speakers of these languages of France predominated among settlers to New France.
 
It could be argued that at least some aspects of more modern Joual are further linguistic contractions of standard French. D'la (de la) is an example where the word de has nearly fallen out of usage over time and has become contracted. This argument does apply to other words, and this phenomenon has become widespread throughout contemporary French language.

A defining characteristic of the sociolect is the deliberate use of the pronoun tu to indicate a question. The pronoun maintains its traditional usage, that of representing the second person singular, but is also used in conjunction with a verb, to indicate a question. Tu is used, for this purpose, regardless of the technically relevant grammatical person. This is because tu, in this use-case, is a contraction of the antiquated t-il particle originating from 13th century France, which was used to indicate a question. For example, in metropolitan french, a question may be asked as simply "Veut-il manger?" whereas in Joual, it may be asked as "Il veux-tu manger?"

Another significant characteristic of Joual is the liberal use of profanities called sacre in everyday speech.

Words of English origin

There are a number of English loanwords in Joual, although they have been stigmatized since the 1960s,<ref>The standard reference to this subject is Gilles Colpron, Les anglicismes au Québec: Répertoire classifié. Montréal: Beauchemin.</ref> instead favoring alternative terms promoted by the Office québécois de la langue française. The commonality of english loanwords in Joual is attributed to the unilingually anglophone nature of the factory owners, business higher-ups, and industrial supervisors which employed the majority of french-speaking blue-collar workers throughout 20th century. This need to use english in workplace environments, when referring to technical elements of the worker's labour, caused the gradual integration of english loanwords into french. These words would eventually come to be conjugated and integrated as though they were traditionally french words (such as "Check" becoming the verb "Chequer"). The usage of deprecated anglicisms varies both regionally and historically. In the table below are a few common Joual words of English origin. 

Some words were also previously thought to be of English origin, although modern research has shown them to be from regional French dialects:
 Pitoune (log, cute girl, loose girl): previously thought to come from "happy town" although the word pitchoune exists in dialects from southern France (possibly coming from the Occitan word pichona, "little girl"), now used to mean "cute girl".
 Poutine: was thought to come from "pudding", but some have drawn a parallel with the Occitan language (also called Provençal or Languedoc) term podinga, a stew made of scraps, which was the previous use of the term in Montreal.

Glossary

In popular culture 
The two-act play Les Belles-sœurs by Canadian writer Michel Tremblay premiered in 1968 at the Théâtre du Rideau Vert in Montreal. Many consider it to have had a profound impact on Canadian culture, as it was one of the first times Joual was seen on a national stage. The play follows a working-class woman named Germaine in Montréal. After winning a million trading stamps, she invites her friends over to help paste them into booklets to redeem them. But Germaine is unsuspecting of her jealous friends who are envious of her winnings. The fact that the play was originally written in Joual is very important to the socio-linguistic aspect of the women. The characters all come from the working class and for the most part, speak in Joual, which at the time was not seen on the main stage. The play was cited at the time as a "radical element among Quebec critics as the dawn of a new era of liberation, both political and aesthetic".

When Les Belles-sœurs premiered in Paris, France in 1973 as it was originally written, in Joual, it was met with some initial criticism. One critic described it as difficult to understand as ancient Greek. Tremblay responded, "a culture should always start with speak to herself. The ancient Greeks spoke to each other".  The popularity of the play has since caused it to be translated into multiple languages, raising controversies in the translation community over retaining the authenticity of Les Belles-sœurs even when not performed in the original dialect of Joual.

Writing in Joual gave Tremblay an opportunity to resist cultural and linguistic "imperialism" of France, while signifying the secularization of Québec culture.

See also
 Anglicism
 Association québécoise de linguistique
 Basilect
 Bilingualism
 Canada
 Canadian French
 Canadien (disambiguation)
 Chaouin
 Chiac
 Cockney
 Demographics of Quebec
 Franglais
 French Canadian
 French Canadians
 French language in Canada
 Language contact
 Language planning
 Languages of Canada
 Linguistic description
 Magoua
 Mixed language
 Mockney
 Post-creole continuum
 Quebec (disambiguation)
 Quebec English
 Quebec French
 Quebec French lexicon
 Quebec French phonology
 Quebec French profanity
 Quebecer (disambiguation)
 Québécois
 Sociolinguistics
 Standard French

Notes

External links
 Article on Joual at Canadian theatre
 Article on Joual in La Linguistique journal
 A few excerpts of texts in Joual
 http://www.yorku.ca/paull/articles/1990h.html
 http://www.yorku.ca/paull/articles/1992.html
 http://www.yorku.ca/paull/articles/2004b.html

Quebec French
Culture of Quebec
Languages of Canada
Oïl languages
Slang
Sociolinguistics
Language varieties and styles
Working-class culture in Canada